The Scout Association of Grenada, the national Scouting organization of Grenada, was founded in 1924, and became a member of the World Organization of the Scout Movement in 1979. This coeducational association has 1,378 members as of 2011.

The Scout emblem features a budding nutmeg, the national symbol.

Caribbean Cuboree

Grenada hosted the 4th and 10th Caribbean Cuborees, in 1985 and 2004 respectively.

See also
 The Girl Guides Association of Grenada

References

World Organization of the Scout Movement member organizations
Scouting and Guiding in Grenada

Youth organizations established in 1924